Events in the year 1872 in Norway.

Incumbents
Monarch: Charles IV (until 18 September), then Oscar II

Events

 18 September – King Oscar II accedes to the throne of Sweden-Norway.
 7 October – The railway line Drammenbanen between Oslo and Drammen is opened.
 Oslo Vestbanestasjon (Oslo V) opens.

Arts and literature

Notable births

7 January – Olaf Sæther, rifle shooter and Olympic gold medallist (died 1945)
9 January – Ivar Lykke, politician and Prime Minister of Norway (died 1949)
6 March – Johan Bojer, novelist and dramatist (died 1959)
7 April – Hendrik Christian Andersen, sculptor, painter and urban planner in America (died 1940)
29 April – Eyvind Alnæs, composer, pianist, organist and choir director (died 1932)
7 May – Peder Østlund, speed skater (died 1939)
28 May – Otto Bahr Halvorsen, politician and twice Prime Minister of Norway (died 1923)
9 June – Olaf Bryn, politician (died 1948)
10 June – Harald Natvig, rifle shooter and Olympic gold medallist (died 1947)
5 July – Sten Abel, sailor and Olympic silver medallist (died 1942)
16 July – Roald Amundsen, polar explorer, led the first Antarctic expedition to reach the South Pole (died 1928)
3 August – Haakon VII, King of Norway (died 1957)
19 September – Ragnvald Hvoslef, politician (died 1944)
25 September – Anna Sethne, educator (died 1961).
8 October – Kristine Bonnevie, biologist and Norway's first female professor (died 1948)
14 October – Ole Østervold, sailor and Olympic gold medallist (died 1936)
17 November – Edvard Engelsaas, speed skater and world champion

Full date unknown
Andreas Baalsrud, engineer (died 1961)
Ingolf Elster Christensen, politician (died 1943)
Oskar Fredriksen, speed skater (died 1920)
Einar Halvorsen, speed skater (died 1964)
Gustav Henriksen, businessperson (died 1939)
Hjalmar Holand, historian (died 1963)
Olav Kavli, businessperson and cheese scientist
Anders Venger, politician and Minister (died 1935)
Hans Westfal-Larsen, ship-owner

Notable deaths

See also

References